Zdzisław Hoffmann (born 27 August 1959) is a retired triple jumper from Poland. He is best known for winning the gold medal at the inaugural 1983 World Championships, for which he was named Polish Sportspersonality of the Year at the end of the year.

Career
He was born in Świebodzin. He finished twelfth at the 1980 European Indoor Championships and competed at the 1980 Olympic Games without reaching the final. In 1983 he won the triple jump event at the inaugural 1983 World Championships. For this he was named the Polish Sportspersonality of the Year at the end of the year.

He finished twelfth at the 1987 World Championships and eighth at the 1988 European Indoor Championships. He became Polish champion in 1981, 1983, 1984 and 1989, and Polish indoor champion in 1980, 1983, 1984, 1987 and 1988.

His personal best jump 17.53 metres, achieved in June 1985 in Madrid. His personal best long jump was 8.09 metres, achieved in May 1983 in Warsaw.

His son, Karol Hoffmann, is also a triple jump athlete.

Competition record

References

1959 births
Living people
Polish male triple jumpers
Athletes (track and field) at the 1980 Summer Olympics
Olympic athletes of Poland
People from Świebodzin
World Athletics Championships athletes for Poland
World Athletics Championships medalists
Sportspeople from Lubusz Voivodeship
Legia Warsaw athletes
World Athletics Championships winners